Merrill House Museum is a Victorian home operated by the Jacksonville Historical Society as a museum in Jacksonville, Florida. The home was built in 1879 at 229 Lafayette Street. It is in the Queen Anne style with Eastlake architecture features. In 2000, the house was designated a local historic landmark. 

It exemplifies the Queen Anne style, with a square tower on the southwest corner and an elaborate vergeboard in the north gable. The porch posts, brackets, and spindles reflect the Eastlake style.

History 
The home was built for James E. Merrill who started an iron works in Jacksonville in 1875. The company became Merrill-Stevens Engineering Co. and by the late 1880s, it was one of the largest shipbuilding companies in the Southern United States. In 1879, the house was built at 229 Lafayette Street, just a short walk from Merrill's iron works on East Bay Street. In 1886, the house was expanded. 

The Merrill family lived in the house from 1879 to 1920. In 1920, the house was sold to Alfred Leach, whose son George sold the house to the city of Jacksonville in 1999. By the 1990s, the house was abandoned and in poor condition. The city acquired the house in its preparations to build the Vystar Veterans Arena. Instead of demolishing the house, the city gave the house to the Jacksonville Historical Society, who then moved the house in 2000 to 317 A Philip Randolph Blvd. In 2002, it was moved again to make space for the 121 Financial Ballpark. In 2006, the Historical Society completed its restorations. The house was restored to reflect the early 1900s.

See also
List of museums in Florida

References

External links
Jacksonville Historical Society's website

Museums in Jacksonville, Florida
Residential buildings completed in 1886
Historic house museums in Florida
Houses in Jacksonville, Florida
Historical society museums in Florida